Sonic Tripod is the second and final studio album by Australian Rock/Pop band The Sharp. It was released in August 1994 and peaked at number 13 on the ARIA charts.

Track listing
 "Hiding" - 4:12
 "Totally Yeah" - 3:46
 "You're Not Alone" - 3:48
 "Nightclub" - 3:35
 "Somethings Nobody Can Change" - 4:02
 "Honest and Sober" - 4:00
 "Where am I Now" - 3:15
 "Alone Like Me" - 3:36
 "Stoplight" - 2:39
 "Hermione" - 3:54
 "Feel You Near" - 4:09
 "Crosswired" - 3:36
 "Delicious" - 4:53
 "Spider" - 3:30
 "I'm Awake" - 3:51
 "Ego Explosion" - 5:56

Charts

Release history

References

1994 albums
Warner Music Australasia albums
The Sharp albums